Bianca Turati (born 17 June 1997) is an Italian former tennis player.

Turati has a career-high singles ranking by the Women's Tennis Association (WTA) of 259, achieved on 12 April 2021. In May 2022, she reached her best doubles ranking of 417.

Turati made her WTA Tour main-draw debut at the 2021 Abu Dhabi Open by defeating Martina Caregaro in the final qualifying round. She then stunned former world No. 25, Yaroslava Shvedova, before losing to eventual finalist Veronika Kudermetova.

Her twin sister Anna is also a professional tennis player.

Turati announced her retirement from tennis in September 2022.

ITF Circuit finals

Singles: 15 (8 titles, 7 runner-ups)

Doubles: 4 (2 titles, 2 runner–ups)

References

External links
 
 
 Bianca Turati at The University of Texas at Austin

1997 births
Living people
Italian female tennis players
Sportspeople from Como
Texas Longhorns women's tennis players
21st-century Italian women